Said Mohammad (also Romanized as Sa‘īd Moḩammad; also known as Seyyed Moḩammad (Persian: سيد محمد) and Sayid Muhammad) is a village in Khararud Rural District, in the Central District of Khodabandeh County, Zanjan Province, Iran. At the 2006 census, its population was 198, in 43 families.

References 

Populated places in Khodabandeh County